The Gwangju Open is a tennis tournament held in Gwangju, South Korea since 2016. The event is part of the ATP Challenger Tour and is played on outdoor hard courts.

Past finals

Singles

Doubles

References

External links 
 ITF search 

ATP Challenger Tour
Hard court tennis tournaments
Tennis tournaments in South Korea
 
Sports competitions in Gwangju